S/2004 S 31 is a natural satellite of Saturn and a member of the Inuit group. Its discovery was announced by Scott S. Sheppard, David C. Jewitt, and Jan Kleyna on October 8, 2019 from observations taken between December 12, 2004 and March 22, 2007.

S/2004 S 31 is about 4 kilometres in diameter, and orbits Saturn at an average distance of 17.568 Gm in 869.65 days, at an inclination of 48.8° to the ecliptic, with an eccentricity of 0.240.

References

Inuit group
Irregular satellites
Moons of Saturn
Discoveries by Scott S. Sheppard
Astronomical objects discovered in 2019
Moons with a prograde orbit